Line S5 of Suzhou Rail Transit (Chinese: 苏州轨道交通S5线) is an under construction north–south regional rapid transit line in Jiangsu, China. 

At present, the northern Suyuzhang section of Suzhou Rail Transit Line 10 has started construction, and the length of this section is 90.34 kilometers. This section runs through Zhangjiagang North Railway Station, Zhangjiagang Coach Station, Zhangjiagang, Tangqiao, Fenghuang, Shanghu, to urban Suzhou at Suzhou North Railway Station and connects the Suzhou city to neighboring county-level cities of Zhangjiagang and Changshu. The Suyuzhang Section expected to open in 2028. 

The line is designed for trains to operate up to 160km/h and have passing loop for Direct Express and Express services to operate.

Later sections of the Line under planning will continue the line south thru city center Suzhou to Wujiang District, Suzhou creating a north south express regional rapid transit line for Suzhou.

References 

Suzhou Rail Transit lines